Robert Somercotes (sometimes Somercote) (died 26 September 1241) was an English Cardinal. He took part in the Papal conclave, 1241, but died during it. It was rumoured at the time that he was papabile and was poisoned, to prevent his election.

He was named as cardinal of the church of San Eustachio in 1239 by Pope Gregory IX. He was buried at the church of San Crisogono in Rome.

Notes

External links
Biography

12th-century births
1241 deaths
13th-century English cardinals
Year of birth unknown